The 2011 Comerica Bank Challenger was a professional tennis tournament played on hard courts. It was the 24th edition of the tournament which was part of the 2011 ATP Challenger Tour. It took place in Aptos, California, United States between 11 and 17 July 2011.

Singles main-draw entrants

Seeds

 1 Rankings are as of July 4, 2011.

Other entrants
The following players received wildcards into the singles main draw:
  Steve Johnson
  Bradley Klahn
  Jack Sock

The following players received entry from the qualifying draw:
  Andre Dome
  Alexander Domijan
  David Martin
  Phillip Simmonds

The following players received entry as a lucky loser into the singles main draw:
  Jimmy Wang
  Rhyne Williams

Champions

Singles

 Laurynas Grigelis def.  Ilija Bozoljac, 6–2, 7–6(7–4)

Doubles

 Carsten Ball /  Chris Guccione def.  John Paul Fruttero /  Raven Klaasen, 7–6(7–5), 6–4

References
Official Website

External links
ITF Search
ATP official site

Comerica Bank Challenger
Nordic Naturals Challenger
Com